Kanji Ram is a Pakistani politician who was a Member of the Provincial Assembly of the Punjab, from June 2013 to May 2018.

Early life 
He was born on 1 January 1971 in Sadiqabad, Punjab, Pakistan into a Punjabi Hindu family.

Political career
He was elected to the Provincial Assembly of the Punjab as a candidate of Pakistan Muslim League (N) on reserved seat for minorities in 2013 Pakistani general election.

References

Living people
Punjab MPAs 2013–2018
Pakistan Muslim League (N) politicians
1971 births